Lord of Terror may refer to:
 Lord of Terror (Oh My Goddess!), a character in Oh My Goddess!
 Lord of Terror (album), an album by Lord Infamous
 Angol Mois, a fictional character also known as the Lord of Terror in the manga Sgt. Frog
 Lord of Terror Baal, a boss in the Disgaea series of video games